Makin' a Move is an album by Henry Threadgill released on the Columbia label in 1996. The album features four songs by the Very Very Circus group and three compositions scored mainly for guitars and cellos.

Reception
The Allmusic review by Glenn Astarita awarded the album 4 stars, stating, "Makin' a Move signifies yet another fascinating glimpse of Threadgill's exclusive artistry".

Track listing
All compositions by Henry Threadgill
 "Noisy Flowers" -  6:42
 "Like It Feels" -  11:16
 "Official Silence" - 8:54
 "Refined Poverty" - 9:04
 "Make Hot and Give" - 7:56
 "The Mockingbird Sin" - 12:13
 "Dirty in the Right Places" - 8:10

Personnel

On 2, 3, 5 and 7:
Henry Threadgill - alto saxophone
Mark Taylor - french horn
Brandon Ross, Ed Cherry - electric guitar
Edwin Rodriguez, Marcus Rojas - tuba
Pheeroan akLaff - drums

On 1, 4 and 6:
Henry Threadgill - alto saxophone (track 4)
Myra Melford - piano (track 1)
Brandon Ross, James Emery - nylon string soprano guitar (tracks 1 & 6)
Ed Cherry - steel-string acoustic guitar (tracks 1 & 6)
Ayodele Aubert - classical guitar (tracks 1 & 6)
Michelle Kinney, Diedre Murray, Akua Dixon Turre - cello (tracks 4 & 6)

References

1995 albums
Henry Threadgill albums
Albums produced by Bill Laswell
Columbia Records albums
Albums recorded at Electric Lady Studios